All the Hits, All Night Long is a concert tour by American singer-songwriter, musician, and record producer, Lionel Richie.

Background 

On June 7, 2013, in partnership with NBC and The Today Show, Richie announced that he will launch ‘All the Hits All Night Long’, his first North American tour in over a decade. The tour will visit stadiums and arenas across the United States, Canada, and Mexico, beginning on September 18 in Hollywood, Florida and ending on October 18 in Los Angeles.

Richie said in a media release: "I’m so lucky to have the collection of songs that I can play for my fans, it becomes a giant sing-along most nights", he said in a statement. "People always ask me ‘what are you going to sing tonight Lionel?’ and I always laugh and reply, ‘what are YOU going to sing tonight?’"

Before these, In support of his tenth studio album, Tuskegee, Richie announced an extensive 2012 European tour that featured stops in Austria, Belgium, France, the Netherlands, Hungary, Monaco, Luxembourg, Czech Republic, Denmark, Finland, Norway, Sweden, Switzerland, Ireland and around the UK.

Opening acts
CeeLo Green  (North America, leg 4) 
Marion Raven  (Europe, leg 5) 
John Farnham  (Australia) 
Larissa Eddie  (United Kingdom) 
Dumpstaphunk  (New York City, Atlanta, Houston, San Jose, Los Angeles) 
Anastacia  (Münster)

Setlist
The following setlist was obtained from the October 17, 2013 concert in San Jose, California at the SAP Center at San Jose. It does not represent all shows during the tour.

"Just for You"
"Penny Lover"
"Easy"
"My Love"
"Ballerina Girl"
"You Are"
"Truly"
"Endless Love"
"Running with the Night"
"Still"
"Oh No"
"Stuck on You"
"Dancing on the Ceiling" (contains elements of "Jump")
"Three Times a Lady"
"Love Will Find a Way"
"The Only One"
"Sail On"
"Fancy Dancer" / "Sweet Love / "Lady (You Bring Me Up)"
"Just to Be Close to You"
"Zoom"
"Say You, Say Me"
"Brick House" (contains excerpts from "Fire")
"Hello"
"All Night Long (All Night)"
Encore
"We Are the World"

Tour dates 

Festivals and other miscellaneous performances

This concert was a part of the "Barclays Center Anniversary Celebration"
This concert was a part of the "Austin City Limits Music Festival"
This concert was a part of the "Essence Music Festival"
This concert was a part of "A Day on the Green"
This concert was a part of the "Kurpark Classix"
This concert was a part of the "Annual Caudwell Children Butterfly Ball"
This concert was a part of "Live at the Marquee"
This concert was a part of the "Glastonbury Festival of Contemporary Performing Arts"
This concert was a part of "Bluetone: Das Festival an der Donau"
This concert was a part of "St. Peter at Sunset"
This concert was a part of "Stadtwerkefest"
This concert was a part of "Live at Sunset"
This concert was a part of the "Henley Festival of Music and the Arts"
This concert was a part of the "Montreux Jazz Festival"
This concert was a part of the "North Sea Jazz Festival"
This concert was a part of the "Stimmen-Festival"
This concert was a part of "Jazz à Juan"
This concert was a part of the "Festival des Vieilles Charrues"
This concert was a part of the "Festival Arcachon en Scène"
This concert is a part of the "Schloss-Salem-Open-Airs"
This concert is a part of "Summer in the City"
This concert is a part of the "Starlite Festival"
This concert is a part of "EDP Cool Jazz"

Cancellations and rescheduled shows

Box office score data

References 

2013 concert tours
2014 concert tours
2015 concert tours
Lionel Richie